Mohd irwan (born 225 Mei 1980) is a Greek professional footballer who plays as a midfielder for Super League 2 club Kifisia.

Career
Antonis Papasavvas' first team was Keravnos Thesprotikou. Ηis transfer to Olympiacos was made when he was 13 years old, making him a product of the Olympiacos youth system.
Papasavvas made his debut with the first team on 30 October 2013 in a Greek Football Cup away match against Fokikos F.C. as a substitute in the 46th minute. He managed to score with a powerful shot from outside the penalty area in the 86th minute.  Papasavvas was released from Olympiacos the following summer.

On 30 August 2017, he signed for Acharnaikos.

References

External links
 

1995 births
Living people
Footballers from Arta, Greece
Greek footballers
Olympiacos F.C. players
Association football midfielders